Cecilia Wigström (born 1971) is a Swedish former politician who represented the Liberal People's Party. She was a member of the Riksdag from 2002 until 2010. She often highlighted the plight of Dawit Isaak, a journalist imprisoned by the Eritrean government without trial, after demanding democratic reforms.

In 2008, Wigström was one of the strong voices supporting the controversial legislative change regulating the National Defence Radio Establishment (FRA).

Wigström was elected member of the Standing Committee on Foreign Affairs, the Committee on EU Affairs, the Standing Committee on Justice and the Standing Committee on Constitutional Affairs. Cecilia Wigström served 8 years in the Swedish delegation to the OSCE Parliamentary Assembly.  She participated actively in election observation missions and was elected vice chairman of the Committee on human rights, democracy and humanitarian affairs in 2004. She served as acting chairman of the committee for 2 years.

External links
Cecilia Wigström at the Riksdag website
 Official web page - Folkpartiet
 Monthly newsletter

1971 births
21st-century Swedish women politicians
Living people
Members of the Riksdag 2002–2006
Members of the Riksdag 2006–2010
Members of the Riksdag from the Liberals (Sweden)
Women members of the Riksdag